The Junior Eurovision Song Contest 2009 was the seventh edition of the annual Junior Eurovision Song Contest and took place in Kyiv, Ukraine. It was scheduled for 21 November 2009. 13 countries were confirmed by the European Broadcasting Union (EBU) to compete in the contest.

The contest was won by Ralf Mackenbach for the Netherlands with the song "Click Clack". At the age of 14, he was the oldest person to win the Junior Eurovision Song Contest in its seven-year history. He was joined by Italy's Vincenzo Cantiello who won the 2014 contest also at the age of 14. Luara Hayrapetyan achieved Armenia another second place. Ekaterina Ryabova also took second place for Russia.

Both Prime Minister Yulia Tymoshenko and President of Ukraine Viktor Yushchenko were present during the final; Tymoshenko was also present and speeched during the opening ceremony on 16 November 2009.

Location

Bidding phase and host selection
The European Broadcasting Union (EBU) invited broadcasters to bid for the rights to host the Junior Eurovision Song Contest 2009; three bids were received from Belarus, Serbia, and Ukraine. TV4 of Sweden had originally sent in a bid during summer 2007, but soon withdrew its bid after deciding to completely withdraw from the contest.

On 6 June 2008, after deliberations by the EBU, the National Television Company of Ukraine (NTU) was granted the rights to the 2009 contest and confirmed they would host it in Kyiv. Ukraine also hosted the Eurovision Song Contest 2005 at the same venue.

On 12 November 2009, Ukrainian Deputy Prime Minister Ivan Vasiunyk declared that the contest would not be postponed; (earlier) Party of Regions member of parliament Hanna Herman had called on Prime Minister Yulia Tymoshenko to cancel the song contest because of the 2009 flu pandemic in Ukraine.

Format

Concept and logo
Logo of the contest titled "Tree of life" is based on the artwork "Sunflower of life" by Maria Primachenko, a well known Ukrainian folk art painter. Creative design of the show was based on the logo of the contest, works and ideas of Primachenko as well as on the concept of the show, titled "For the joy of people".

Presenters
On 22 October 2009, it was revealed that Ani Lorak, Timur Miroshnychenko and Dmytro Borodin would be hosting the contest, with Borodin serving as the green room host.

Opening and interval acts 
The show was opened by the children's ballet A6 and the Jazz-Step Dance Class of Volodymyr Shpudeyko; they were followed by the children's sports dancing ensemble Pulse. Young acrobats Karyn Rudnycka and Yuriy Kuzynsky accompanied all participating contestants on stage, whilst Ani Lorak performed during the interval.

Participants and results 

The EBU announced the complete list of participating countries in the 2009 contest on 8 June 2009. 13 countries competed in the contest. Sweden returned after missing the previous year's contest, while ,  and  withdrew from the contest.

According to the rules of the contest, participants must sing in one of their national languages, however they are permitted to have up to 25% of the song in a different language.

Detailed voting results 

Each country decided their votes through a 50% jury and 50% televoting system which decided their top ten songs using the points 12, 10, 8, 7, 6, 5, 4, 3, 2, and 1. Since Sweden did not broadcast the show until the morning after, their points were made up solely by their national jury.

12 points
Below is a summary of all 12 points received. All countries were given 12 points at the start of voting to ensure that no country finished with nul points.

Spokespersons 

 Elise Mattison
 Philip Masurov
 Razmik Arghajanyan
 Iulia Ciobanu
 Nevena Božović
 Ana Davitaia
 
 Yiorgos Ioannides
 Daniel Testa
 Marietta
 
 Arina Aleshkevich
 Jovana Krstevska

Broadcasts 

A live broadcast of the Junior Eurovision Song Contest was available worldwide via satellite through European streams such as TVRi, RIK Sat, RTS Sat and MKTV Sat. The official Junior Eurovision Song Contest website also provided a live stream without commentary via the peer-to-peer medium Octoshape.

Official album

Junior Eurovision Song Contest 2009: Kyiv – Ukraine, is a compilation album put together by the European Broadcasting Union, and was released by Universal Music Group on 21 November 2009. The album features all the songs from the 2009 contest, along with karaoke versions.

See also
 Eurovision Song Contest 2009

References

External links

 
2009
2009 in Ukraine
2000s in Kyiv
2009 song contests
Events in Kyiv
November 2009 events in Europe